Cyril Ramond (born February 12, 1980 in Romans-sur-Isère) is a French professional football player. Currently, he plays in the Championnat National for Rodez AF.

He played on the professional level in Ligue 1 for Montpellier HSC, Ligue 2 for ASOA Valence, Montpellier HSC, AS Nancy and Stade Brestois 29 and Belgian First Division for K. Sint-Truidense V.V.

In March 2006, Ramond and two other players were questioned by the police as part of an investigation into match-fixing.

References

1980 births
Living people
French footballers
French expatriate footballers
Expatriate footballers in Belgium
Ligue 1 players
Ligue 2 players
ASOA Valence players
Montpellier HSC players
AS Nancy Lorraine players
Sint-Truidense V.V. players
Rodez AF players
Association football defenders
People from Romans-sur-Isère
Sportspeople from Drôme
Footballers from Auvergne-Rhône-Alpes